

Werner Goeritz (9 March 1892 – 27 May 1958) was a German general during World War II. He was a recipient of the Knight's Cross of the Iron Cross of Nazi Germany.

Awards and decorations

 Knight's Cross of the Iron Cross on 6 November 1943 as Generalleutnant and commander of 291. Infanterie-Division

References

Citations

Bibliography

 

1892 births
1958 deaths
Lieutenant generals of the German Army (Wehrmacht)
German Army personnel of World War I
Recipients of the clasp to the Iron Cross, 1st class
Recipients of the Gold German Cross
Recipients of the Knight's Cross of the Iron Cross
German prisoners of war in World War II
Military personnel from Braunschweig
German Army generals of World War II